Lori Lynn Lively is an American actress, television co-host/designer, and acting coach. Best known for Dead Space (1991).

Early life 
Lively was born into a family of actors. Her mother, adoptive father and all four siblings are, or have been, in the entertainment industry. She is the daughter of talent manager Elaine Lively (née McAlpin) and Elaine's first husband Ronnie Lively (Ronald Otis Lively). Her siblings are brother Jason, sister Robyn, half-sister Blake, and half-brother Eric.

Filmography

References

External links

American film actresses
American television actresses
Living people
Place of birth missing (living people)
Lori
20th-century American actresses
21st-century American actresses
Year of birth missing (living people)